"Bad Blood" is a song by British band Bastille and the second single from their debut studio album of the same name. It was released as a single in the United Kingdom on 19 August 2012. Both "Bad Blood" and its B-side track "Haunt (Demo)" were included on their 2013 Haunt EP, along with "Pompeii" and "Overjoyed".

Music video
A music video to accompany the release of "Bad Blood" was first released onto YouTube on 29 June 2012 at a total length of three minutes and thirty-four seconds. The video was directed by Olivier Groulx and features model Betty Jacobsson.

Track listing
Digital download
 "Bad Blood" – 3:32
 "Haunt" (Demo) – 2:53
 "Bad Blood" (F*U*G*Z Remix)  – 3:41
 "Bad Blood" (Mele Remix) – 4:21
 "Bad Blood" (Lunice Remix) – 3:53
 "Bad Blood" (music video) – 3:47

Charts

Weekly charts

Year-end charts

Certifications

Release history

References

2012 songs
2012 singles
Bastille (band) songs
Virgin Records singles
Songs written by Dan Smith (singer)